SolvV is short for Solvabilitätsverordnung which means solvability directive in German, i.e. the delegated legislation of §§ 10 ff of the Kreditwesengesetz and in effect since 2006. The long name in German is Verordnung über die angemessene Eigenmittelausstattung von Instituten, Institutsgruppen und Finanzholding-Gruppen, literally "directive on the appropriate setting of equity for (financial) institutes, groups of institutes and financial holding groups". There is an analogous directive with the same name in Austria.

See also
 Basel Accords as basis for the Kreditwesengesetz
 MaRisk, minimum requirements for risk management in Germany
 Sarbanes–Oxley Act on similar topics legally binding within the US

External resources 
 (Unofficial) text of the law (in German)
 Definition of solvency regulation by Deutsche Bundesbank

2008 in law
European Union corporate law
German business law